Kåre Karlsen (9 September 1930 – 4 September 2009) was a Norwegian politician for the Centre Party.

He served as a deputy representative to the Parliament of Norway from Troms during the term 1973–1977. In total he met during 11 days of parliamentary session.

References

1930 births
2009 deaths
Deputy members of the Storting
Centre Party (Norway) politicians
Troms politicians